D410 branches off to the southwest from D8 in Split towards the Port of Split - ferry access to Supetar (D113), Bol and Milna on Brač Island, Stari Grad (D116) and Jelsa on Hvar Island, Vela Luka on Korčula Island (D118), Rogač on Šolta Island (D112), as well as to Vis (D117), Lastovo (D119), Drvenik Veli and Drvenik Mali islands. There is also an international ferry services to Ancona, Italy. The road is 4.0 km long.

The road, as well as all other state roads in Croatia, is managed and maintained by Hrvatske ceste, state owned company.

Traffic volume 

D410 traffic is not counted directly, however Hrvatske ceste, operator of the road reports number of vehicles using ferry service flying from the Port of Split, accessed by the D410 road, thereby allowing the D410 traffic volume to be deduced. Furthermore the D410 is a part of Split urban transportation system servicing a considerable urban traffic far exceeding the ferry traffic. Substantial variations between annual (AADT) and summer (ASDT) traffic volumes are attributed to the fact that the road serves as a connection carrying substantial tourist traffic to Split area islands, while the D8 and D1 state roads provide quick access to A1 motorway Dugopolje interchange.

Road junctions and populated areas

Sources

State roads in Croatia
Transport in Split-Dalmatia County